Randy Walker (August 21, 1968 – November 30, 1995), better known by his stage name Stretch, was an American rapper and record producer, working in Live Squad. In the early 1990s, he joined 2Pac's rap group Thug Life. The November 30, 1994, shooting of Shakur led to their split. On November 30, 1995, Walker was shot and killed at the age of 27.

Live Squad 
Randy Walker was born in 1968 in Springfield Gardens, Queens, to an African American father and Jamaican, immigrant mother. Randy had a younger brother and two sisters. His father died in 1981, and his mother, Lucilda, was a nurse at New York University Medical Center.

In the late 1980s, Randy, dubbed Stretch, and his brother Christopher, dubbed Majesty, teamed with DJ K-Low, forming Live Squad. In 1988, both rapping and producing it, Live Squad debut with an EP, titled BQ In Full Effect, which, featuring Percee P, includes the tracks "Troopin It" and "We Ain't Havin' It." Noteworthy is Stretch's voice, deep and raspy.

In 1990, Stretch met Shock G of Digital Underground, the Bay Area rap group's 1991 album featured Stretch on its track "Family of the Underground." That year, Live Squad remixed the group's single "No Nose Job." That summer, Stretch met Underground ally Tupac "2Pac" Shakur. The two became fast friends. Rapping his February 1992 single "If My Homie Calls" on Yo! MTV Raps, 2Pac was backed by Stretch, friend of host Ed Lover, who, praising Live Squad's demo tape and taking "executive producer" credit on its releases, helped Live get signed to Tommy Boy Records.

In 1992, Live Squad released a double A side, "Murderahh!"/"Heartless," followed by single, "Game of Survival"/"Pump for a Livin'," in 1993. Live Squad also released an ultra-violent promo short film, Game Of Survival, on VHS tape, showcasing six songs from through group's forthcoming album. In June, national outrage broke out over the Los Angeles area's original gangsta rapper Ice-T's side project, his rock band Body Count's album of heavy metal with its track "Cop Killer." Tommy Boy, favoring radio friendliness, dropped Live Squad and shelved the album.

Teaming with 2Pac 
While Tupac filmed his breakthrough role in Juice, Stretch and Treach, of rap group Naughty By Nature, were extras. Once Tupac's trailer was robbed of jewelry, they delivered a beatdown on set. In late 1991, after studio recordings, live shows, and TV appearances with Stretch, 2Pac put out his debut album, 2Pacalypse Now, with two tracks, including "Crooked Ass Nigga," where Stretch produces and raps.

Unable to put a track on Juice's soundtrack, 2Pac saw his album sell modestly, but Juice's release in 1992 sent his star on the rise. In 1993, 2Pac's second album, Strictly 4 My N.I.G.G.A.Z., found Live Squad producing and featured on "Strugglin'," while featured, along with Treach and rapper Apache, on "5 Deadly Venomz." That was produced by Stretch, who produced two more tracks, "The Streetz R Deathrow" and, featuring Live Squad, "Holler If Ya Hear Me."

Stretch made cameo appearances in music videos for the Mac Mall song "Ghetto Theme," directed by Tupac, and, in 1993, for the Above The Law, Money B, and Tupac song "Call It What You Want,". He appeared in movies, Ed Lover & Doctor Dre's 1993 film Who's the Man? and Tupac's 1996 film Bullet. In March 1994, on The Arsenio Hall Show, 2Pac and Stretch performed "Pain," a track on the Above the Rim soundtrack's only cassette version and merely a single's B side, but swiftly a rap favorite.

2Pac's group Thug Life
In 1992, with rapper Big Syke, 2Pac and Stretch recorded "Thug Life." In 1993, that song is still unreleased, Tupac expanded the group, named Thug Life, and got it on Interscope Records, releasing in 1994 the group's only album, Thug Life: Volume 1. Stretch produced and rapped on "Thug Music" and the lead single, "Bury Me a G." Amid controversy over lyrics, the label cut "Out on Bail", which Tupac and Stretch performed at The '94 Source Awards, anyway, and "Runnin' from tha Police", featuring Biggie Smalls.

In 1993, Tupac met Biggie, a promising young rapper from Brooklyn, on his visit to California. Tupac supported and mentored him, a prospective member of Thug Life. During 1993, Live Squad, 2Pac, and Biggie performed a joint set at Maryland's Bowie State University, in Prince George's County, Maryland. and recorded "House Of Pain," unreleased, for Biggie's debut album in the making.

Biggie's debut album arrived, without the song, in 1994 as Ready to Die. The alliance was severed through events on the night of November 30, 1994, at the Times Square building of Quad Recording Studios.

November 1994 shooting 
In late 1994, Tupac was reportedly hired by fledgling music manager James "Jimmy Henchman" Rosemond to record a verse for rapper Lil' Shawn's single "Dom Perignon." Arriving with Stretch and two others, they reportedly found rapper Lil' Cease—a member of the Bad Boy record label's circle via Biggie's side group Junior M.A.F.I.A.—watching the sidewalk from above and greeting them. In the lobby, three men pulled pistols to rob Tupac, who, resisting, was shot five times.

Suspecting a shooting as the primary motive, Tupac pointed to, among others, Henchman and Biggie. Blaming Henchman for the setup, Tupac accused Biggie of withholding prior knowledge.

The day after the shooting Tupac was convicted in a Manhattan court of sexual assault. On February 14, 1995, he was sentenced to at least a year and a half in prison. In March, 2Pac's third album, Me Against the World, was released with Stretch removed from its track "So Many Tears." In a jailhouse interview published in April, Tupac discusses the November shooting and Stretch, incidentally 6'8":

"I was, like, 'What should I do?' I’m thinking Stretch is going to fight; he was towering over those niggas. From what I know about the criminal element, if niggas come to rob you, they always hit the big nigga first. But they didn’t touch Stretch; they came straight to me."

In the interview, Tupac reflected,

No strong evidence emerged to implicate Stretch in the crime. Publicly responding, Stretch contended, "Pac's saying all this shit in the interview, like, 'I thought that Stretch was gonna fight. He was towering over them.' Now, that nigga know I ain't never going out like no bitch. But I ain't dumb. I ain't got no gun, what the fuck am I supposed to do? I might be towering over niggas, but I ain't towering over no slugs."

Some reporting suggested forensics evidence that Tupac had shot himself. Stretch offered, "Me personally, I only heard one shot. ... Tupac got shot trying to go for his shit. He tried to go for his gun, and he made a mistake on his own. But I'll let him tell the world that. ... He tried to turn around and pull the joint out real quick, but niggas caught him. Grabbed his hand when it was by his waist."

Bill Courtney, retired New York Police Department officer, once with its infamous "Hip-Hop Squad," suggested that the stickup answered Tupac's comments, published in New York's Daily News, about Jimmy Henchman's associate Haitian Jack, big in the Queens nightlife scene and criminal underworld. Haitain Jack and two other men had been indicted with Tupac for the November 1993 sexual assault on a woman in Tupac's hotel room, whereby Tupac was convicted on December 1, 1994.

By then, Haitian Jack had taken a misdemeanor plea deal for no jail time, and the newspaper published Tupac's gripe. The onetime "Hip-Hop Squad" officer hazards, "A message was being sent to him not to name-drop." Jimmy Henchman has since commented, "Nobody came to rob you. They came to discipline you."

On June 15, 2011, the day before what would have been Tupac's 40th birthday, Dexter Isaac, imprisoned for murder, sent from Brooklyn's Metropolitan Detention Center to AllHipHop.com a confession. Isaac stated that he had been one of the men who in November 1994 robbed and shot Tupac at Jimmy Henchman's behest.

Death 
On October 12, 1995, with bond posted via Suge Knight, CEO of Death Row Records, and pending appeal, Tupac was released from prison in upstate New York. Joining the label in Los Angeles, Tupac feverishly recorded his fourth album, All Eyez on Me. Two tracks, in particular—"Ambitionz Az a Ridah" as well as "Holla At Me"—have lyrics against Stretch, one envisioning his death.

By the album's release on February 13, 1996, Stretch was already dead. Released a few months later, in July 1996, the sophomore album, It Was Written, by rapper Nas, from Queensbridge in Queens, had Live Squad production on two tracks, "Take It In Blood" as well as "Silent Murder," from Stretch's final recording session exactly one year after the November 30, 1994, shooting of Tupac.

On November 30, 1995, Stretch was on his way to a Biggie Smalls event after leaving the Nas recording session at midnight. He dropped off his own brother Majesty at his Queens Village home. Two or three men in a black car pulled up beside Stretch's green minivan, and gave chase, firing from a rolled down window. Stretch crashed at 112th Avenue and 209th Street, just after 12:30 AM. He was found dead with four bullets to his back.

In one theory, Stretch had robbed "a big drug dealer of over 10 bricks". Despite the "pressure on the street," he refused to return the over 10 kilograms of cocaine, and this is why "a hit was issued." In April 2007, via separate investigation into the murder of Jam Master Jay of Run-DMC, in his native Jamaica, Queens, federal prosecutors named Ronald "Tenad" Washington as a suspect in both murders.

After Tupac's death in a drive-by shooting in Las Vegas, in September 1996, a Live Squad production, the track "Nothing to Lose," appeared on the first posthumous 2Pac album, released in 1997, R U Still Down? (Remember Me). Released in 1997, Greatest Hits has the cryptic "God Bless the Dead," dedicated to "Biggy Smallz," but not the famed Live Squad and onetime 2Pac associate Biggie Smalls who is otherwise called The Notorious B.I.G., and instead a Latino rapper who worked with one of 2Pac's main producers, Johnny J.

In 1999, a promotional release for The Notorious B.I.G.'s posthumous album Born Again, has a Bad Boy remix of "House of Pain," featuring Stretch and 2Pac. Stretch's brother Majesty founded Grand Imperial Records jointly with rapper E-MoneyBags. He was killed in July 2001, allegedly by order of Kenneth "Supreme" McGriff, a suspect behind the murder of Jam Master Jay. In 2001, Majesty released the Live Squad album that Tommy Boy Records had nixed, Game Of Survival.

Discography

See also
List of murdered hip hop musicians
List of unsolved murders

Notes

External links
 Stretch at Discogs
 Live Squad at Discogs
 
  Live Squad Fan Site (archived)

1968 births
1995 deaths
1995 murders in the United States
20th-century American male actors
20th-century American male musicians
20th-century American rappers
African-American male actors
African-American male rappers
American rappers of Jamaican descent
Deaths by firearm in Queens, New York
Gangsta rappers
Male murder victims
Murdered African-American people
Musicians from Queens, New York
People murdered in New York City
Rappers from New York City
Unsolved murders in the United States
20th-century African-American musicians